Mujeres de negro, is a Mexican telenovela produced by Carlos Moreno for Televisa. It premiered on August 22, 2016. A total of 50 episodes have been confirmed so far.

The main protagonists are portrayed by Alejandra Barros, Mayrín Villanueva and Ximena Herrera. Leticia Calderón and Arturo Peniche portray the main antagonists, with Diego Olivera and Alexis Ayala.

Plot 
In the rich coastal town of Encino Blanco, three married couples spend the weekend at Coral Beach while their husbands go on their already traditional fishing trip on a yacht. Not far from the pier, the yacht suddenly explodes. Only chips remain on the surface. In seconds they lost their husbands, and they have to go on with their lives without them ... just as they planned.

Vanessa, Jackie and Katia have had very comfortable lives and their marriages before the others are almost perfect, but in reality the women are extremely unhappy because of their husbands.

Julio, Vanessa's husband, has gotten into shady deals that endanger the lives of Vanessa and Diego, his nine-year-old son. Jackie's husband, Lorenzo, is controlling, and humiliates and beats her without allowing her to have a life of her own. Nicolás, Katia's husband, has been in depression for years, with several suicide attempts, breaking his wife's dreams of having a family.

After the "accident", the widows, who were thought to have a normal, quiet lives find their lives transformed into a whirlwind of emotions and imbalance, as the police discover a bomb caused the yacht explosion. Now the police must find the culprit. The three women get into a world in which their lives are always in danger and where the economic interests of laboratories harass them.

Cast

Main 

 Mayrín Villanueva as Vanessa Leal
 Alejandra Barros as Jackie Acosta
 Ximena Herrera as Katia Millán
 Arturo Peniche as Bruno Borgetti
 Diego Olivera as Patricio Bernal
 Alexis Ayala as Julio Zamora
 Leticia Calderón as Irene Palazuelos

Secondary 

 Bruno Bichir as Zacarías Zaldívar
 Marcelo Córdoba as Eddy Quijano
 Mark Tacher as Nicolás Lombardo
 Francisco Gattorno as Lorenzo Rivera
 Lourdes Reyes as Rita Kuri
 Emmanuel Palomares as José Rivera
 Manuel Ojeda as Enríquez
 Julieta Egurrola as Isabella de Zamora
 Lilia Aragón as Catalina de Lombardo
 Diego Escalona as Diego Zamora
 Pedro Sicard as Arturo
 Marco de Paula as Sandro
 Yolanda Ventura as Giovanna
 Isabella Camil as Miriam del Villar
 Jean Paul Leroux as Lascurain
 Lupita Lara as Tania
 Juan Ángel Esparza as Víctor Martínez
 Iván Caraza as Esteban
 Paola Real as Danna Quijano

Recurring 

 Adanely Núñez as Rebeca
 Arlette Pacheco as Elisa
 Ricardo Franco as Rico
 Jonathan Kuri as Alberto Ramos
 Sandra Kai as Ximena
 Jony Hernández as Ramírez
 Juan Alejandro Ávila as Duarte
 Michel Gregorio

Series overview

Episodes

Season 1

Season 2

Awards and nominations

References 

Televisa telenovelas
2016 telenovelas
2016 Mexican television series debuts
2016 Mexican television series endings
Mexican television series based on non-Mexican television series
Spanish-language telenovelas